Firehouse, Hook & Ladder Company 8 is a New York City Fire Department (FDNY) fire station, located at 14 North Moore Street at its intersection with Varick Street in the Tribeca neighborhood of Manhattan, New York City. Its exterior has become famous for its appearance in the supernatural comedy franchise Ghostbusters.

History
The firehouse was built in 1903 after the establishment of the FDNY as the base of the formerly independent Hook and Ladder fire company 8. The building was designed as the first of a series of Beaux-Arts style firehouses by the city superintendent of buildings, Alexander H. Stevens. The building, which originally had two vehicle doors, was halved in size in 1913 after Varick Street was widened.

The firefighters of Hook & Ladder No. 8 were among the first responders to the September 11, 2001, attacks. In 2011, the firehouse was threatened with closure after the city administration planned to close 20 fire companies to save money. But after a public campaign to save it, supported by the later Mayor Bill de Blasio and the actor Steve Buscemi, who also was a New York City firefighter from 1980 to 1984, the firehouse remains in service. From 2016 to 2018, it was subject to a renovation costing $6 million.

Filming location
The firehouse was selected as the base of the Ghostbusters for the 1984 film after an early draft of the script envisaged the Ghostbusters as a public service much like the fire department. Reportedly, the firehouse was chosen because the writer and actor Dan Aykroyd knew the area and liked the building. While the firehouse served as the set for exterior scenes, the interior of the Ghostbusters base was shot in a Los Angeles studio, and in Fire Station No. 23, a decommissioned Los Angeles firehouse. 

In the 2016 reboot of Ghostbusters, the firehouse makes two appearances.

The firehouse has also appeared in the 2005 film Hitch and in episodes of the television series Seinfeld and How I Met Your Mother.

The firehouse regularly displays half of the screen-used sign from Ghostbusters II on the wall inside the firehouse. In 2021, fans engaged in a fundraising campaign and donated a full-size replica Ghostbusters sign to the firehouse. The sign now prominently hangs outside year-round, above the main entrance, and is visited often by fans. This has led to an annual fundraiser, with a celebration at the firehouse planned each year in early June to coincide with "Ghostbusters Day."

References

External links 

1903 establishments in New York City
Fire stations completed in 1903
Fire stations in New York City
Ghostbusters
Tribeca
Government buildings in Manhattan